

The Bureau of Buddhist and Tibetan Affairs, or Xuanzheng Yuan was a government agency of the Mongol-led Yuan dynasty of China to handle Buddhist affairs across the empire in addition to managing the territory of Tibet. It was originally set up by Kublai Khan in 1264 under the name Zongzhi Yuan or the "Bureau of General Regulation", before it was renamed in 1288.

The bureau was set up in Khanbaliq (modern Beijing) and was named after the Xuanzheng Hall where Tibetan envoys were received in the Tang dynasty. In the Yuan dynasty, Tibet was managed by the Bureau of Buddhist and Tibetan Affairs, separate from the other Yuan provinces such as those established in the former territories of the Song dynasty. While no modern equivalents remain, the political functions of the Bureau of Buddhist and Tibetan Affairs might have been analogous to the India Office in London during the British Raj. Besides holding the title of Imperial Preceptor or Dishi, Drogön Chögyal Phagpa, the fifth leader of the Sakya school of Tibetan Buddhism, was concurrently named the director of the Bureau of Buddhist and Tibetan Affairs.

One of the department's purposes was to select a dpon-chen ('great administrator', a civilian administrator who governed Tibet when Sakya Lama was away), usually appointed by the lama and confirmed by the Yuan emperor in Beijing. Tibetan Buddhism was not only practiced within the capital Beijing but throughout the country. Apart from Tibetan affairs, the Bureau of Buddhist and Tibetan Affairs managed the entire Buddhist clergy throughout the realm (whether they were Han Chinese, Tibetan or Korean etc.), and supervised all temples, monasteries, and other Buddhist properties in the empire, at least in name. According to scholar Evelyn Rawski, it supervised 360 Buddhist monasteries. To emphasize its importance for Hangzhou, capital of the former Southern Song dynasty and the largest city in the Yuan realm, a branch (行, Xing, "acting") Xuanzheng Yuan was established in that city in 1291. In public and official meetings, Tibetan Buddhism was practiced alongside Han Buddhism.

The Lifan Yuan (also known as the Board for the Administration of Outlying Regions and Office of Mongolian and Tibetan Affairs etc.) was roughly a Qing dynasty equivalent of the Xuanzheng Yuan, instituted by the Qing Empire for administering affairs in Tibet and other border regions.

See also 

 Administrative divisions of the Yuan dynasty
 Tibet under Yuan rule
 Imperial Preceptor
 Dpon-chen

Similar government agencies
 Lifan Yuan (Qing dynasty)
 Mongolian and Tibetan Affairs Commission (Republic of China)
 State Ethnic Affairs Commission (People's Republic of China)
 State Administration for Religious Affairs (People's Republic of China)

Notes

References

Bibliography 

 
 
 
 
 
 
 Rossabi, Morris. Khubilai Khan: His Life and Times (1989) Univ. of California Press. 
 
 
 
 
 

Government of the Yuan dynasty
History of Tibet
China–Tibet relations
Buddhism and government
1264 establishments
1354 disestablishments